Vivienne Joyce Binns  (born 1940) is an Australian artist known for her contribution to the Women's Art Movement in Australia, her engagement with feminism in her artwork, and her active advocacy within community arts. She works predominantly in painting.

Early life
Binns was born in Wyong, New South Wales, Australia, in 1940. She was the youngest of five children of her parents Joyce and Norman. Norman had enlisted in the army six months prior to Vivienne's birth and spent the majority of five years serving in the Middle East and Papua New Guinea, while Joyce and the children lived in Young, New South Wales. In 1945, following the end of the war, the Binns family returned to Sydney, where Binns grew up, first in Willoughby then Wollstonecraft. 

From 1953, Binns attended North Sydney Girls High School. She later pursued her tertiary education in art at the National Art School from 1958 to 1962. After her graduation, Binns stayed on campus and took on a teaching role in the drawing department. She never conformed to traditional gender roles, and, during a time of "initial, intense, introversion", was questioning her sexuality as well as interrogating the philosophies and ideas in making art, in particular Dadaism.

Career
Binns' first solo exhibition Vivienne Binns: Paintings and Constructions was held at Watters Gallery in Sydney in 1967. Her most well-known painting, Vag Dens, featuring a brightly-coloured vagina with teeth, was hung alongside Phallic Monument, which featured male genitals. Some critics excoriated her work, using phrases such as "monumental repulsion", "pure obscene horror", "the most disturbing artwork I've ever seen". Artist and critic Elwyn Lynn wrote that her work her work "affronts masculinity".

After this show, Binns felt that she needed a break from painting, and became involved in community arts. In 1973, Binns worked as a field officer for the Community Arts Program, an Australia Council initiative, visiting regional areas to "investigate needs, resources and possibilities" and doing a huge amount to stimulate and promote community arts. She started working with vitreous enamel and other mediums formerly regarded as "crafts" rather than art.

She was influenced by and became a friend of visiting US feminist art critic Lucy Lippard in 1975, afterwards visiting New York City and connecting with the women's art movement there.

In 1979, she began her artist-in-residence program at the University of New South Wales, followed by artist-in-community placements in a range of locations across New South Wales from 1980 to 1988.

From the late 1980s Binns taught painting and drawing at the University of Sydney Art Workshop, the Tin Sheds. In 1994 she taught painting and drawing at Charles Sturt University at Albury. She then moved to Canberra to take up a lecturing position at the Canberra School of Art (later amalgamated with the Australian National University as the ANU Institute of the Arts), teaching several subjects.

In 1990 Binns travelled to central Australia and learnt some of the creation stories, art and culture from Pitjantjara women. Also in 1990, In 1990, she was awarded an Australian Arts Creative Fellowship, enabling her to undertake a three-year research project about the cultural link between Australia and the Asia-Pacific. In 1991, Binns spent time in Tokyo on an Australia Council residency, and later attended three South Pacific Festivals of the Arts, in Raratonga (1992), Western Samoa (1996) and Noumea (2000). These led to a significant amount of work which included references to Captain James Cook and the artists who travelled with him, and incorporating patterns of tapa cloth, the traditional bark cloth of the Pacific region.

In 1995 she started producing her extensive series entitled In Memory of the Unknown Artist, honouring the artistic endeavours of people not generally considered to be artists, such as designers of fabric, linoleum, carpet and bathroom tiles; housewives; traditional craftspeople; street artists and hobby artists. She continued to create artworks in this series through the 2000s. 

In 2000, she was resident in the Australia Council Studio in London and, in 2001, again visited Europe assisted by an ANU Faculties Research Grant.

In 2002 Binns travelled to the Kimberleys, afterwards including imagery relating to the landscape of the area, sometimes combined with Cook-related imagery and patterned surfaces. In 2003, she collaborated with Geoff Newton and Derek O'Connor on a series of split canvases.

She retired from teaching in 2012.

Binns held a solo exhibition It Is What It Is at the Sutton Gallery, by whom she is represented, in Melbourne in 2018.

In 2019 Vivienne Binns was interviewed in a digital story and oral history for the State Library of Queensland's James C Sourris AM Collection. In the interview Binns talks about her life, her art and her inspirations. 

, aged 81, she still works and paints in her studio, although at a slower pace and sometimes intermittently; she has had one painting on the go for two years.

A major survey exhibition of her work entitled Vivienne Binns: On and through the Surface opened at MUMA (Monash University Museum of Art) on 5 February 2022, finishing up there in April and starting a run at the Museum of Contemporary Art Australia in Sydney in July. The exhibition includes more than 100 works, including prints, sculpture and drawing as well as her earliest paintings.

Art practice
Binns has worked across many media, including painting, printmaking, performance, sculpture and drawing. Her diverse range of artistic engagements has resulted in her being well respected amongst her Australian and global contemporaries, particularly within the feminist community.

Painting
Throughout the span of her practice, Binns has developed a strong reputation for her prolific approach to painting. Her first solo exhibition Vivienne Binns: Paintings and Constructions, was held in 1967 at Watters Gallery in Sydney. Including notable works such as Vag Dens and Phallic Monument, this exhibition has been recognised as a key starting point for the development of feminist art in Australia. This exhibition was one of the first of its kind, predating Judy Chicago's The Dinner Party and "critically affirming the power of women's sexuality whilst also provoking... a good measure of castration anxiety amongst the patriarchy".

Through decades of experimentation with colour and form, Binns has conceptually explored ideas ranging from feminism to colonial critique within her painting practice. Binns utilises abstraction as a way to communicate complex ideas and make them accessible to a broader audience.

Women's Art Movement

Alongside feminist contemporaries such as Barbara Hall, Frances Phoenix (nee Budden), Beverly Garlick, Jude Adams and Toni Robertson, Binns was at the forefront of the development of The Women's Art Movement (WAM) in Sydney, Beginning in 1973 and inspired by Linda Nochlin’s essay "Why Have There Been No Great Women Artists?", WAM aimed to address discrimination and sexism within the art world through various actions and exhibitions. Binns was a founding member in 1974. WAM was particularly dedicated to the documentation of women's artwork through the development of the Women's Art Register.

Feminism and the Women's Art Movement serves as a political undercurrent for much of Binns practice:

Community art
Binns was a prominent figure in the development of community arts in Australia. In 1972 she collaborated with Mike Morris and Tim Burns on The Artsmobile, a travelling community arts project that brought Dada and Surrealist style performance work to centres along the north east coast of NSW. Described as "the offspring of a marriage between Fluxus and a local town council bookmobile", the Artsmobile brought a variety of art-based activities to schools, seniors centres and public parks.

Continuing with her interest in community arts and also related to the questions raised by the Women's Art Movement, Binns developed Mothers' Memories, Others' Memories in 1978 during her artist's residency at the University of New South Wales. Beginning with staff and students of the university, Binns later expanded the project to the Sydney suburb of Blacktown, where she worked closely with Patricia Parker, a community officer at the Blacktown City Council. Mothers' Memories, Others' Memories recalled the "lives of women and their means of expression in the domestic sphere", through facilitating a space where participants could come and share stories of the various craft and needlework skills that they had been taught from their mothers and other members of their family. Described as "dense, fragmented, [and] multilayered" The final work was exhibited as a series of postcards installed on a postcard rack. The project continued until 1981.

In 1983, Binns began work on her next major community art project Full Flight. Travelling and living in a caravan for two years in the Central West region of New South Wales, Binns stayed for two to four months in each town facilitating workshops, mural painting and skill sharing. This project celebrated "the creativity of ordinary people"

Her interest in community arts came primarily from an urge to make the art world accessible to everyone beyond the constraints of art institutions. Binns believed that creative expression was an inherent part of the human experience, and not allowing for this expression freely was a form of "social control": 

In 1989, Binns began another community art project, The Tower of Babel, at the Watters Gallery. It started with 50 small dioramas, created by herself as well as friends, mentors, students and acquaintances, including Irene Maher, Mike Brown, Ruth Waller, Bonita Ely and Eugene Carchesio. The project is still ongoing as of 2022, when it comprises 90 boxes.

In 1991, Binns was the general editor of Community and the Arts: History, Theory, Practice, a collection of essays which served as a "theoretical text for community practitioners in the arts".

Recognition and awards
According to the Australia Council, "Binns was one of the first artists in Australia to critically engage with feminism and pioneered dialogues between Australian art and international feminism".

In 1983, Binns was awarded an Order of Australia Medal for Services to Art and Craft. She was also awarded the Ros Bower Memorial Award for visionary contribution to Community Arts in 1985.

In 1990, she was awarded an Australian Arts Creative Fellowship, which financed her three-year research project about the cultural link between Australia and the Asia-Pacific.

Her work was selected for invitational prizes the John McCaughey Memorial Prize (2008) and Clemenger Contemporary Art Award (2009) at the National Gallery of Victoria.

In 2021, Binns was the recipient of an Australia Council Award for Visual Arts.

Exhibitions 
Binns has been a part of many exhibitions spanning over fifty years of art practice, including:

Solo exhibitions
 1967 Paintings and Constructions, Watters Gallery, Sydney
 1971 Funky Enamel Ashtrays, Watters Gallery, Sydney
 1973 Enamel Panels, University of Tasmania, Hobart and Raffins Gallery, Orange, New South Wales 
 1985 Watters Gallery, Sydney 
 1990 Drawings of God, Tower of Babel, Bellas Gallery, Brisbane 
 1992 Sutton Gallery, Melbourne 
 1994 Surfacing in the Pacific, Bellas Gallery, Brisbane
 1995 Pacific Strands, Australian Girls' Own Gallery (aGOG), Canberra 
 1996 Slicing History in the Pacific, Bellas Gallery, Brisbane 
 1996 In Memory of the Unknown Artist and Others, Watters Gallery, Sydney 
 1999 PATTERNING: In Memory of Unknown Artists, Sutton Gallery, Melbourne 
1999 TRANSLATIONS: Remembering Unknown Artists, Bellas Gallery, Brisbane
1999 Rocks and Relics: Cook to Lake Cargelligo, The Cube, Canberra Contemporary Art Space, Canberra 
 2004 Vivienne Binns: Twenty First Century Paintings, curated by Merryn Gates, The Cross Art Projects, Sydney 
 2005 Some New, Some Old, Some Collaborations, Sutton Gallery, Melbourne 
 2006-8 Vivienne Binns, touring exhibition curated by Merryn Gates, Tasmanian Museum and Art Gallery, Hobart; The Drill Hall Gallery, Australian National University, Canberra; Penrith Regional Gallery, Penrith, NSW; and Bathurst Regional Gallery, Bathurst, NSW 
 2008 Everything New is Old Again, Sutton Gallery, Melbourne
 2012 Vivienne Binns, Art and Life (mini –Survey), curated by Penny Peckham, La Trobe University Museum of Art, Melbourne 
 2018 It is what it is what it is, Sutton Gallery, Melbourne
 2022 Vivienne Binns: On and through the Surface, MUMA, Melbourne, then Museum of Contemporary Art Australia, Sydney

Group exhibitions
 1971 Woom, environmental lightshow with Roger Foley (Ellis D Fogg), Watters Gallery, Sydney 
 1972 The Jo Bonomo Story - A Show of Strength, a group happening, Watters Gallery, Sydney 
 1978 An exhibition of work by homosexual and lesbian artists, Watters Gallery, Sydney
 1980 Mothers' Memories, Others' Memories, Blacktown artist in community and participation project, Watters Gallery, Sydney; Ewing and George Paton Galleries, University of Melbourne, Melbourne 
 1981 Australian Perspecta, Art Gallery of New South Wales, Sydney 
 1981-83 Full-Flight, artist-in-community in the central western region of NSW
 1982 Biennale of Sydney, Art Gallery of New South Wales, Sydney 
 1987 Contemporary Art in Australia A Review, Museum of Contemporary Art, South Brisbane 
 1991 Frames of Reference: Aspects of Feminism and Art, Pier 4/5, Sydney 
 1996 Women Hold Up Half the Sky: The Orientation of Art in the Post-War Pacific, MUMA, Melbourne
 1997 I had a Dream: Australian Art in the 1960s, National Gallery of Victoria, Melbourne 
 1998 Patterning: Layers of Meaning in Contemporary Art, curated by Merryn Gates, touring to Canberra; Bandung, Jakarta, Ubud, Yogyakarta, Indonesia; Lahore, Pakistan; and Manila, Philippines 
 2000 On the Brink: Abstraction in the 90’s, Heide Museum of Modern Art, Melbourne 
 2007 Cross Currents: Focus on Contemporary Australian Art, Museum of Contemporary Art, Sydney 
 2012 Sixties Explosion, Macquarie University Art Gallery, Sydney 
 2014 Binns + Valamanesh, Casula Powerhouse, Sydney 
 2015 Pop to Popism, Art Gallery of New South Wales, Sydney 
 2017-18 Unfinished Business: Perspectives on Art & Feminism, Australian Centre for Contemporary Art, Melbourne

Major collections 
Her work is represented in private collections as well as in many major collections, including:
 Art Gallery of New South Wales, Sydney
 Art Gallery of Western Australia, Perth
 Australian National University, Canberra
 BHP, Melbourne
 Canberra Museum and Gallery, Canberra
 Griffith University Art Collection, Queensland
 Ian Potter Museum of Art, Melbourne.
 Kohlberg Kravis Roberts
 Monash University Museum of Art (MUMA), Melbourne
 National Gallery of Australia, Canberra
 National Gallery of Victoria, Melbourne
 Newcastle Art Gallery, Newcastle, New South Wales
 Parliament House Art Collection, Canberra
 Perc Tucker Regional Gallery, Townsville, Queensland
 Queensland Art Gallery, Brisbane
 University Art Gallery, Queensland University, Brisbane
 University of Western Australia, Cruthers Collection of Women's Art
 Wesfarmers, Perth

References

External Links 

 Vivienne Binns OAM digital stories and oral history. John Oxley Library, State Library of Queensland, 25 June 2019, 6min, 28:57min and 58min version available to view online.

1940 births
Living people
Australian women painters
Recipients of the Medal of the Order of Australia
Academic staff of the Australian National University
20th-century Australian women artists
20th-century Australian artists
21st-century Australian women artists
21st-century Australian artists